Michael Nathan Scharf (born January 6, 1969 in Albany, New York) is an American poet and critic. Scharf's poetry "mimics a vernacular language so debased it does actual harm." He was poetry reviews editor at Publishers Weekly from 1997 until 2006. At Poets & Writers magazine, he founded and wrote the column Metromania. In 1999, he founded Harry Tankoos Books, which publishes books and chapbooks; in 2006, with the poet Joshua Clover, he co-founded the small press , publisher of Kevin Killian's Action Kylie, among other books. He holds a B.A. in cognitive science from Vassar College, and a M.A. in linguistics from Brown University. His work has appeared in Chain, ubuweb, Jacket, the Germ, and the Poetry Daily Essentials anthology.

Works 
 Telemachiad (sugarhigh!, 1999), 64pp.
 Vérité (/ubu, 2002), 58pp.
 For Kid Rock / Total Freedom (Spectacular, 2007), 96pp
 Autoportraits from an Earlier Era (SA editions, 2009), 13pp.

Essays & Articles 
 Scharf on the use of poetry criticism in Jacket Magazine, 2000 
 Scharf on Austrian writers’ protests in Poets & Writers, 
 Scharf on Meghalaya, India in Change Observer

Reviews of Scharf's Work 
 For Kid Rock / Total Freedom, Stop Smiling, 2007. 
 Vérité, Overlap, 2003 
 Vérité, Pantaloons, 2004 
 Telemachiad, A Tonalist Notes, 2006

References 

American male poets
Living people
Vassar College alumni
Brown University alumni
1969 births
Writers from Albany, New York
21st-century American poets
21st-century American male writers